Flustra is a genus of bryozoans belonging to the family Flustridae. The genus has a cosmopolitan distribution.

Species
Many formerly included species have been moved to different taxa. The following species are currently recognised:

Flustra anguloavicularis 
Flustra digitata Packard, 1867
Flustra foliacea 
Flustra italica Spallanzani, 1801
Flustra nordenskjoldi Kluge, 1929
Flustra pedunculata (Busk, 1884)
Flustra separata Waters, 1888
† Flustra sexagona Mokrinskiji, 1916 
Additionally, it contains these currently disputed taxa:

 † Flustra arenosa Ellis & Solander, 1786 
 Flustra bombycina Ellis & Solander, 1786
 Flustra ceranoides Lamouroux, 1816
 † Flustra duvaliana Michelin, 1845  
 Flustra horneri (Kirchenpauer, 1869)
 Flustra ramosa (Jullien, 1888)

References

Cheilostomatida
Bryozoan genera